Ada the Country is a 2020 Nigerian musical written by Titilope Sonuga and produced by Marian Ogaziechi under the theatrical studio of Doyenne Circle Productions. The play stars Nollywood actresses Patience Ozokwor, Joke Silva and Bikiya Graham Douglas.

Development 
Although in the works for about ten years, the show was written in 2019.

Synopsis 
Ada, a young woman, is involved in a fire accident which destroys her property and kills her 9 month old daughter, Chiamaka. At the time, her husband Femi was away from home, only returning when the fire has ravaged their home. In the aftermath of the incident Ada becomes depressed. She leaves her husband to return to her parents' home, where family members accuse her of being insensitive and inhumane for leaving Femi. She speaks to the other women in her family, including her divorced sister, a single mother, and a working class woman struggling with sexism at work. Through sharing their experience of living as women in Nigeria, Ada is able to find some healing and reconcile with her husband.

Productions 
The show debuted in January 2020.

The show was performed at MUSON Centre, Onikan, Lagos from April 15 to 18, 2022. The show was directed by Kemi Lala-Akindoju.

In October 2022 Doyenne Circle brought the show to Abuja, where it was performed at the Musa Yaradua Centre on 21 and 22 October. This staging was directed by Kenneth Uphopho.

Cast

References 

2020 musicals

Arts in Nigeria
Original musicals
Nigerian musicals